The Qur'an (lit. recitation) is meant to be recited. Its verses are divided according to the rhythm of the language. The Qur'anic punctuation is, therefore, not only based on the structure or the syntax of the sentence, but also on the need to pause, for breath or for effect. Pickthall observes, when a certain sound which marks the rhythm recurs, there is a strong pause and the verse ends naturally, although the sentence may go on to the next verse. Thus the Qur'anic punctuation affects the pronunciation of the words, rhythm, intonation and syllable separation.

History 
There are various conventions related to punctuation varying from time and place to another. Although there were manuscripts written on the topic, the convention that took off is attributed to Muhammad ibn Tayfour Sajawandi (d. 560 AH).

There are various hadiths related to the topic, one of them being:

Punctuation marks

Full Stop 
۝  - After a full stop, the last letter of the verse loses its vowel, if consonant, or converts the tanwin into an elongated alif, if an alif's tanwin.

Signs of pause 
These are generally placed at the top of the line they apply to in a verse.

Mandatory Pauses 
It means disregarding the sign may lead to change in the meaning.

Full stop even though the verse is not complete.

 - Lam and alif glyph which means 'no' in Arabic when uttered in isolation. Forbidden stop. If stopped, the reciter should start from a place before the sign, unless it's the end of a verse.

Pause without breathing out, giving a silence effect.

 or  - Same with the previous one, but with a somewhat longer pause.

Discretionary Pauses 
Because the reciter may feel the need to stop, for example, because of need for a breath or other bodily necessities, there are these signs placed.

It is better to stop, but in one's own discretion, may proceed also.

It is better not to stop.

It is better not to stop but if the reciter is tired or any other valid reason, one may stop.

It is better not to stop.

It is better to stop, facilitating the understanding of the verse's meaning.

The majority view is that one should pause here.

It is better to pause.

It is better not to pause.

The reciter can stop or continue depending on his convenience.

 - Named  (hugging) signs, these three dots are usually paired and placed near each other. The reciter should stop at one of them, though which one is in their own discretion. In Indopak mushafs, these three dots are placed above a small  sign.

Marginal marks 
These show the divisions of the mushaf into chapters, parts and sections. It's arranged into 114 chapters (surah). Each chapter consists of a number of verses (ayah). Verses are numbered at the end inside the full stop sign. A chapter may additionally be divided into sections (ruku''' ). The end of a section is shown by an 'ayn''  sign.

The mushafs are also divided into thirty equal parts (juz'), for those who wish to finish the recitation in a given time. These are indicated at the start of each one which occurs in 20 pages in most modern mushafs. The ajza' (pl. of juz') are further divided, which makes them 60th parts of a mushaf, hizb.

The word  (prostration) written on the margin or on an ayah sign means that a Muslim reciting that verse and the ones listening should offer a prostration. This sign is found in 14 places in a mushaf. All the sajda verses are Meccan.

There are some marginal signs used in the Indian subcontinent:

࣢  Used in the subcontinent, this indicates a difference of opinion on the pause.

 (pause of the Prophet) for pause,

 for pause,

 for 'Do not pause'.

See also 
 Qāriʾ
 Qira'at
 Tajweed
 Tarteel
 Tilawa

References

Quranic studies